Arthur Young may refer to:

Politicians
Sir Arthur Young (colonial administrator) (1854–1938), British Governor of the Straits Settlements
Sir Arthur Young, 1st Baronet (1889–1950), Scottish Unionist Party Member of Parliament (MP)
Sir Arthur Young (police officer) (1907–1979), Commissioner of the City of London Police
Arthur Young (Australian politician) (1816–1906), member of the Tasmanian House of Assembly
Arthur Herbert Young (1873–1943), Pitcairn Islands politician

Business
Arthur Young (accountant) (1863–1948), founder of the accountancy company which became Ernst & Young in 1989
Arthur Young (architect) (1853–1924), English architect
Arthur Young (agriculturist) (1741–1820), English agriculturist, writer and economist (son of Arthur Young the divine)
Arthur Howland Young (1882–1964), American engineer and vice president of US Steel

Sports
Arthur Young (rugby union, born 1855) (1855–1938), Scotland international rugby union player
Arthur Young (rugby union, born 1901) (1901–1933), English rugby union player
Arthur Young (footballer) (fl. 1906), Scottish footballer

Arts
Arthur Young (actor) (1898–1959), English actor
Art Young (1866–1943), American cartoonist and writer
Arthur M. Young (1905–1995), American inventor and philosopher

Other people
Arthur Young (divine) (1693–1759), English clergyman and divine
Arthur N. Young (1890–1984), American economist and U.S. government official

See also
 Young Arthur, a 2002 NBC TV drama